Fable: The Balverine Order is a fantasy novel by Peter David. It is the first book from the Fable video game series, and takes place sometime after Fable II.

Plot
The story is told from the point of view of a king of an unknown country who listens to an unnamed story-teller in the Fable universe. The central story involves the characters Thomas Kirkman, a wealthy son of a textile merchant whose mother's death puts him on his quest to find a balverine, and his manservant, James Skelton, a child in a large poor family. The two friends brave the wilds in search of a balverine that killed Thomas' brother, Stephen.

The plot of the story takes place between Fable II and Fable III.

Release
The novel was released in North America and Europe in October 2010. The book was released with an exclusive code to unlock a unique weapon in Fable III.

See also
 List of novels based on video games

References

2010 American novels
American fantasy novels
Fable (video game series)
Novels based on video games
Novels by Peter David
Works based on Microsoft video games
Ace Books books